The 1939 World Table Tennis Championships men's singles was the 13th edition of the men's singles championship. 

Richard Bergmann defeated Alojzy Ehrlich in the final, winning three sets to nil to secure the title. The eventual champion Bergmann and former winner Viktor Barna both represented England after fleeing the Nazis in Europe.

Only 11 men's teams and 5 women's teams entered the Championships. Hungary, the United States and Austria were the major nations missing.

Results

See also
List of World Table Tennis Championships medalists

References

-